William the Conqueror is a 2015 French historical film directed by Fabien Drugeon. The film is about William the Conqueror when he is about to embark from Dives-sur-Mer to conquer England in the year 1066. In the event that he would not return alive, William introduced his son Robert to his loyal barons to receive the ducal throne heritage.

We then have an extensive flashback. William's father Duke Robert declares William his heir before departing for a pilgrimage to Jerusalem. The barons swear loyalty. However, Robert dies and William, still a child, has to flee.

We then see a long sequence with William as a fugitive. Finally, as a young man, he persuades the King of France to lend him an army. He wins a crucial battle and becomes Duke.

During the 1066 sections of the film, William tells a friend that it is not the weather that is delaying him. At the end, he gets a messenger from Norway. Presumably this tells him that Harold Hardrada is invading England, which will pull Harold Godwinson north and make the conquest much more likely to succeed.

Cast 

Dan Bronchinson as William of Normandy, later William the Conqueror
Geoffroy Lidvan as Osbern the Steward
Eric Rulliat as Renouf
Thomas Debaene as William FitzOsbern
Pierrick Billard as Gilbert, Count of Brionne

References

External links

2015 films
2010s historical films
French historical films
2010s French-language films
Films set in the 11th century
2010s French films
Cultural depictions of William the Conqueror